Blend is a Swedish brand of cigarettes, currently owned and manufactured by Swedish Match AB.

History
Blend was introduced in 1971 by Swenska Tobaks AB as a cigarette brand with lower tar. The first variant, which came to be known as yellow blend after the colour of the package, had 12 milligrams of tar. The following year, a menthol flavoured variant was launched called Blend Blue.

Markets
The brand's focal market is Sweden, but its products are also available in Finland, Spain and Russia.

See also

 Tobacco smoking

References

Cigarette brands